CIPU or Cipu may refer to:

Cipu language, spoken in Nigeria
CIPU-FM, Canadian first nations radio station
Center for Intellectual Property Understanding, American organisation
Critical Infrastructure Protection Unit of the Administration Police of Kenya

See also
Cipus, legendary Roman praetor